Jerónimo Arturo Amione Cevallos (born 31 March 1990) is a Mexican former professional footballer who played as a forward.

Born in Mexico, Amione is Lebanese from his father's side, and Mexican from his mother's side. He represented Mexico at youth level at the 2011 Pan American Games, winning the tournament. Amione obtained Lebanese citizenship in 2017; however, FIFA didn't consider him eligible for the national team as he had already represented Mexico competitively prior to becoming Lebanese.

Club career
Amione made his senior debut for Atlante on 23 April 2010 as a substitute in a match against Estudiantes Tecos, he scored a goal in the 9 minutes he played in a 3–2 defeat. He was runner up in the 2013 Copa MX, where they lost to Cruz Azul. Later that year, he joined Cruz Azul.

On 30 December 2018, Amione signed for FC Lahti in Finland on a one-year deal with an option to extend it with one further year. He signed for Ascenso MX side Mineros de Zacatecas on 23 January 2020.

International career

Mexico
Amione was part of the under-23 side, in which Mexico captured its gold medal in 2011 Pan American Games. He also appeared in the 2012 CONCACAF Men's Olympic Qualifying Tournament, however he was not included in the final 18 squad to participate in the 2012 Olympic football tournament. Mexico later won its first ever gold medal in their history. Amione scored four goals in 11 appearances for the Olympic team.

Lebanon
Due to not being further selected into the main squad of Mexico, speculation emerged that he had opted to join the Lebanese national team. The rumours were confirmed when he accepted the offer to play for Lebanon. On 18 December 2018, FIFA refused the Lebanese Football Association's request of changing Amione's national team from Mexico to Lebanon on the basis that "at the time of his first appearance [...] for Mexico, he did not yet hold the Lebanese nationality", a prerequisite necessary for changing national teams.

Personal life
Born in Mexico City, Amione is of Lebanese descent on his father's side (from the Lebanese town of Amioun) and of Mexican descent on his mother's side. He obtained Lebanese citizenship on 14 November 2017.

Honours 
Atlante
Copa MX runner-up: Clausura 2013

Cruz Azul
CONCACAF Champions League: 2013–14

Mexico U23
Pan American Games: 2011
CONCACAF Olympic Qualifying Championship: 2012

References

External links
 
  
 
 
 

1990 births
Living people
Footballers from Mexico City
Mexican people of Lebanese descent
Citizens of Lebanon through descent
Association football forwards
Liga MX players
Atlante F.C. footballers
Cruz Azul footballers
Deportivo Toluca F.C. players
Club Puebla players
Lobos BUAP footballers
FC Lahti players
Mineros de Zacatecas players
Ascenso MX players
Veikkausliiga players
Mexican expatriate footballers
Expatriate footballers in Finland
Mexican expatriate sportspeople in Finland
Mexico youth international footballers
Footballers at the 2011 Pan American Games
Pan American Games medalists in football
Pan American Games gold medalists for Mexico
Medalists at the 2011 Pan American Games
Sportspeople of Lebanese descent
Mexican footballers